River Kallar is a perennial tributary of  River Pamba, the third longest river in the South Indian state of Kerala. Kallar originates in the forests of Ranni Reserve in the eastern part of Pathanamthitta district. As the name implies the river bed is mostly stony (Kallu+ aar = Stony River). It flows its entire length through rich forests before merging with River Pamba at Vadasserikkara. Small villages such as Thannithode, Thekkuthode and Manneera are the major human settlements along the banks of this river.  Kallar is the main component of Adavi ecotourism project at Mannera in the Konni forest division where it offers an opportunity for coracle riding along a three kilometer stretch. The river supports rich diversity of plants and animals.    

Rivers of Pathanamthitta district
Pamba River